Mollinedia argyrogyna is a species of plant in the Monimiaceae family. It is endemic to Brazil.  It is threatened by habitat loss.

References

argyrogyna
Endemic flora of Brazil
Flora of the Atlantic Forest
Near threatened plants
Near threatened biota of South America
Taxonomy articles created by Polbot